Adam James may refer to
Adam James (actor) (born 1972), British actor
Adam James (singer), Australian country singer

See also

James Adam (disambiguation)